Maria Collett (born July 21, 1974) is a Greek-born American politician serving as a Democratic member of the Pennsylvania State Senate who represents the 12th District. Her district includes portions of eastern Montgomery County and southern Bucks County. Collett is the first Greek American woman to serve in the Pennsylvania State Senate.

Political career

Elections

2018
In 2018, Collett ran unopposed in the Democratic primary for the election to succeed retiring State Senator Stewart Greenleaf, who had represented the 12th District since 1979. Collett defeated Stewart Greenleaf Jr., Greenleaf's son and a former Controller for Montgomery County, in the November 6 general election. Her victory was part of the "blue wave" that increased Democratic and female representation in the Pennsylvania General Assembly and Congressional delegation.

Committee assignments
For the 2021-2022 Session Collett sits on the following committees in the Senate:
 Aging and Youth - Minority Chair
 Community, Economic, and Recreational Development
 Judiciary
 Local Government
 Rules & Executive Nominations

Caucuses
Collett is a member of the following caucuses:
 Senate Arts & Culture
 Autism & Intellectual Disabilities
 Senate Brain Injury
 Climate
 Film Industry
 LGBT Equality
 PA Safe
 Rare Disease
 Senate Women's Health Caucuses.

Councils and task forces
Collett serves on the following councils, committees, and task forces:
 Asian American Coalition for Healthcare Services Advisory Board 
 Joint Legislative Air and Water Pollution Control and Conservation Committee 
 Legislative Audit Advisory Commission
 Montgomery County Aging and Adult Services Council 
 Pennsylvania Advisory Council on Elder Justice in the Courts
 Pennsylvania Children's Health Advisory Council
 Pennsylvania Long-Term Care Council
 Special Education Funding Commission
 Suicide Prevention Task Force

Legislative priorities
As a State Senator, Collett has focused on the issues of PFAS contamination throughout her district, nurse staffing ratios, the statute of limitations for sexual crimes, gender equity, and firearm regulation.

Career
Collett began her career as an attorney representing the interests of children victimized by abuse and neglect as a Deputy Attorney General in Camden County, New Jersey. She then transitioned to a career in nursing, where she worked at the bedside as a Level I trauma nurse, in pediatric home health and in long-term care working with aging adults. Most recently, she worked as a nurse educator, helping other nurses understand how to administer Medicaid programs.

In the 2021-2022 Legislative Session, Collett was elected by her colleagues in the Senate Democratic Caucus to the position of Caucus Secretary.

Education
Collett attended the University of Maryland, College Park where she earned a BA in English Literature, going on the earn a JD at Rutgers Law School and then a BSN at Drexel University.

References

External links
Pennsylvania State Senate website
Collett on Ballotpedia

Living people
People from Lower Gwynedd Township, Pennsylvania
University of Maryland, College Park alumni
Drexel University alumni
Rutgers University–Camden alumni
Democratic Party Pennsylvania state senators
Women state legislators in Pennsylvania
21st-century American women politicians
American people of Greek descent
1974 births

Politicians from Montgomery County, Pennsylvania